The Order of Sikatuna is the national order of diplomatic merit of the Republic of the Philippines. It is conferred upon individuals who have rendered exceptional and meritorious services to the Republic of the Philippines, upon diplomats, officials and nationals of foreign states who have rendered conspicuous services in fostering, developing and strengthening relations between their country and the Philippines, or upon personnel of the Philippine Department of Foreign Affairs (DFA), both in the Home Office and in the Foreign Service.

The Order of Sikatuna may be awarded by the Secretary of Foreign Affairs in the name and by authority of the President.

History
The Order of Sikatuna was established by President Elpidio Quirino as the "Order of Sikatuna" through Executive Order No. 571 dated February 27, 1953. Section 2 of the executive order states, "The Order of Sikatuna [...] commemorates the first treaty (Pacto de Sangre) between the Philippines and a foreign country..." In the Quirino order, the Order of Sikatuna commemorates the pacto de sangre or blood compact, more popularly known as sandugo. This was, according to the Executive Order, the first international treaty of friendship between Bohol native chieftain, Datu Sikatuna and Spanish conquistador Miguel López de Legazpi,  between a Filipino and Spaniard. Lately, however, the Executive Order's premise has been put to question. The event was not the first blood compact since the first recorded happened 44 years before between Ferdinand Magellan, representing the Spanish crown, and raia Siaiu, king of the island-port of Mazaua. Magellan called the ceremony "casi casi", a Malayan term meaning "to be one and the same thing" or to be blood brothers. At the same time the first recorded Treaty of Peace was entered into on Tuesday, April 9, 1521, by datu Humabon of Cebu and Magellan.

The Order of Sikatuna's composition was expanded from the original four classes by Presidents Diosdado Macapagal and again by Ferdinand E. Marcos. In 2003, President Gloria Macapagal Arroyo reformed the Philippine system of orders, medals, and decorations, through Executive Order No. 236, known as the Honors Code of the Philippines which codified the civilian orders, decorations and medals of the Republic of the Philippines. Among its provisions was one renaming the order as simply, "The Order of Sikatuna," and clarifying its protocolar standing.

Ranks

Grand Collar (GCS) (Raja) – Conferred upon a former or incumbent Head of State and/or of government
Grand Cross (GCrS) (Datu) – The Grand Cross shall have two distinctions:  (i) Gold (Katangiang Ginto) and (ii) Silver (Katangiang Pilak). The Grand Cross may be conferred upon a Crown Prince, Vice President, Senate President, Speaker of the House, Chief Justice or the equivalent, foreign minister or other official of cabinet rank, Ambassador, Undersecretary, Assistant Secretary, or other person of a rank similar or equivalent to the foregoing
Grand Officer (GOS) (Maringal na Lakan) – Conferred upon a Chargé d'affaires, e.p., Minister, Minister Counselor, Consul General heading a consular post, Executive Director, or other person of a rank similar or equivalent to the foregoing
Commander (CS) (Lakan) – Conferred upon a Chargé d'affaires a.i., Counselor, First Secretary, Consul General in the consular section of an Embassy, Consular officer with a personal rank higher than Second Secretary, Director, or other person of a rank similar or equivalent to the foregoing
Officer (OS) (Maginoo) – Conferred upon a Second Secretary, Consul, Assistant Director, or other person of a rank similar or equivalent to the foregoing
Member (MS) (Maharlika) – Conferred upon a Third Secretary, Vice Consul, Attaché, Principal Assistant, or other person of a rank similar or equivalent to the foregoing

Awardees

Ambassadors

Aftab Ahmad Khan - Ambassador of Pakistan to the Philippines, Rank of Datu, 1986.
 - Ambassador of Spain to the Philippines, Rank of Datu, 1986.
Aftab Ahmad Khan - Ambassador of Pakistan to the Philippines, Rank of Datu, 1986.
Stephen W. Bosworth - Ambassador of the United States to the Philippines, Rank of Datu, 1987.
Pasi Rutanen - Ambassador of Finland to the Philippines, Rank of Datu, 1987.
Knut Mørkved - Ambassador of Norway to the Philippines, Rank of Datu, 1987.
Kiyoshi Sumiya - Ambassador of Japan to the Philippines, Rank of Datu, 1988.
 - Ambassador of Germany to the Philippines, Rank of Datu, 1989.
Bruno Torpigliani - Apostolic Nuncio to the Philippines, Rank of Datu, 1990.
Tsuneo Tanaka - Ambassador of Japan to the Philippines, Rank of Datu, 1990.
Nicholas Platt - Ambassador of the United States to the Philippines, Rank of Datu, 1991.
Edward Lee Kwong Foo - Ambassador of Singapore to the Philippines, Rank of Datu, 1993.
Rodolfo Severino, Jr. - Secretary-General of the Association of Southeast Asian Nations (ASEAN), Rank of Datu, 1997, Rank of Raja, November 2001.
U San Thein - Ambassador of Myanmar to the Philippines, Rank of Datu, 1999.
Robert Collette - Ambassador of Canada to the Philippines, Rank of Datu, 2003.
Herbert Jess - Ambassador of Germany to the Philippines, Rank of Datu, 2004.
 Francis J. Ricciardone, Jr. - Ambassador of the United States to the Philippines, Rank of Datu, 2005.
Stanislav Slavicky - Ambassador of the Czech Republic to the Philippines, Rank of Datu, 2005.
Wu Hongbo - Ambassador of China to the Philippines, Rank of Datu, 2005.
Iskandar Bin Sarudin - Ambassador of Malaysia to the Philippines, Rank of Datu, 2006.
Joao Jose Gomes Caetano da Silva - Ambassador of Portugal to the Philippines, Rank of Datu, 2006.
Graeme Matheson - Ambassador to New Zealand to the Philippines, Rank of Datu, Gold Distinction, 2011.
Robert Gerard Brinks - Ambassador of the Netherlands to the Philippines, Rank of Datu, Silver Distinction, 2012.
Alcides G. R. Prates - Ambassador of Brazil to the Philippines, Rank of Datu, Silver Distinction, 2012.
Wadee Al-Batti - Ambassador of the Iraq to the Philippines, Rank of Datu, Silver Distinction, 2013.
Harry K. Thomas Jr. - Ambassador of the United States to the Philippines, Rank of Datu, 2013.
Christopher Thornley - Ambassador of Canada to the Philippines, Rank of Datu, 2013.
 Yohanes K Legowo, Ambassador of the Republic of Indonesia to the Philippines, Rank of Datu, 2014
 Bill Tweddell - Ambassador of Australia to the Philippines, Rank of Datu, Gold Distinction, 2016.
 Dato Mohd Zamri bin Mohd Kassim - Ambassador of Malaysia to the Philippines, Rank of Datu, Gold Distinction, 2016.
 Johny Lumintang, Ambassador of the Republic of Indonesia to the Philippines, Rank of Datu, Silver Distinction, 2017
Erik Førner - Ambassador of Norway to the Philippines, Rank of Datu, 2018.
 Jaroslav Olša, Jr. - Ambassador of the Czech Republic to the Philippines, Rank of Datu, Gold Distinction, 2018.
 Amanda Gorely - Ambassador of Australia to the Philippines, Rank of Datu, Silver Distinction, 2018.
 Dato’ Razlan Abdul Rashid - Ambassador of Malaysia to the Philippines, Rank of Datu, Silver Distinction, 2018.
 Jan Top Christensen - Ambassador of Denmark to the Philippines, Rank of Datu, Gold Distinction, 2019
Archbishop Gabriele Giordano Caccia - Apostolic Nuncio to the Philippines and Dean of the Diplomatic Corps, Rank of Datu, Gold Distinction, 2019.
Koji Haneda - Ambassador of Japan to the Philippines, Rank of Datu, Gold Distinction, 2020.
Sinyo Harry Sarundajang, Ambassador of the Republic of Indonesia to the Philippines, Rank of Datu, Gold Distinction, Posthumous, 2021
Saskia de Lang - Ambassador of the Kingdom of the Netherlands to the Philippines, Rank of Datu, Silver Distinction, 2022.

Heads of State
 Plaek Phibunsongkhram - Prime Minister of Thailand, 1955
Ngo Dinh Diem - 1st President of the Republic of Vietnam, 1956
King Norodom Sihanouk of Cambodia, 1956
Generalissimo Chiang Kai-shek - President of the Republic of China, 1960
Dwight D. Eisenhower - 34th President of the United States, 1960
Syed Putra of Perlis - Yang di-Pertuan Agong of Malaysia, 1961
 Crown Prince Akihito of Japan, 1962
 Generalissimo Francisco Franco - Head of the Spanish State, 1962
Antonio Segni - 4th President of Italy, 1962
King Rama IX of Thailand, 1963
Heinrich Lübke - 6th President of Germany, 1964
Philibert Tsiranana - 1st President of the Malagasy Republic, 1964
Emperor Hirohito of Japan, 1966
Suharto - 2nd President of Indonesia, 1968
King Mahendra of Nepal, 1971
Lee Kuan Yew - 1st Prime Minister of Singapore, 1974
Kakuei Tanaka - Prime Minister of Japan, 1974
Juan Carlos de Borbon - Prince of Spain, 1974
Nicolae Ceaușescu - 1st President of Romania, 1975
Dr. Benjamin Sheares - 2nd President of Singapore, 1976
King Hussein of Jordan, 1976
Kriangsak Chamanan - Prime Minister of Thailand, 1978
Fra' Angelo de Mojana di Cologna - 77th Prince and Grand Master of the Sovereign Military Order of Malta, 1979
Yasuhiro Nakasone - Prime Minister of Japan, 1983
Raúl Alfonsín - President of Argentina, 1986
Virgilio Barco Vargas - 27th President of Colombia, 1987
Muhammad Khan Junejo - 10th Prime Minister of Pakistan, 1988
Francesco Cossiga - 8th President of Italy, 1988
Sultan Hassanal Bolkiah of Brunei Darrussalam, 1988
François Mitterrand - 21st President of France, 1989
Chuan Leekpai - Prime Minister of Thailand, 1993
Kim Young-sam - 7th President of South Korea, 1994
Ja'afar of Negeri Sembilan - Yang di-Pertuan Agong of Malaysia, 1995
Ernesto Pérez Balladares - 33rd President of Panama, 1995
Carlos Menem - President of Argentina, 1995
Eduardo Frei Ruiz-Tagle - 31st President of Chile, 1995
Konstantinos Stephanopoulos - President of Greece, 1997
Khalifa bin Salman Al Khalifa - 1st Prime Minister of Bahrain, 2001
Ion Iliescu - 2nd President of Romania, 2002
Crown Prince Naruhito of Japan, 2002
George W. Bush - 43rd President of the United States, 2003
Barack Obama - 44th President of the United States, 2014
Susilo Bambang Yudhoyono - 6th President of Indonesia, 2015
 Shinzo Abe - Prime Minister of Japan, 2015
Fra' Matthew Festing - 79th Prince and Grand Master of the Sovereign Military Order of Malta, 2015
Takeo Fukuda - Prime Minister of Japan, 2017

Others
 Alberto Martín-Artajo - Foreign Minister of Spain, Rank of Lakan, 1953 
Carlos P. Romulo - Filipino diplomat, Rank of Maharlika, 1953, Rank of Rajah, 1982 
Vũ Văn Mẫu - Foreign Minister of South Vietnam, Rank of Lakan, 1956 
Narciso Ramos - former Secretary of Foreign Affairs, Rank of Datu, 1970 
Carl Albert - Speaker of the United States House of Representatives, Rank of Lakan, 1971 
Kim Yong-shik - Foreign Minister of South Korea, Rank of Datu, 1972 
Maraden Panggabean - 15th Minister of Defence of Indonesia, Rank of Datu, 1972 
Goh Keng Swee - Minister of Defence of Singapore, Rank of Datu, 1972 
Mochtar Kusumaatmadja - Minister of Foreign Affairs of Indonesia, Rank of Datu, 1980
Washington SyCip - Filipino businessman, Rank of Maginoo, 1980 
Taha Muhie-eldin Marouf - Vice President of Iraq, Rank of Raja, 1982 
Dante Caputo - 99th Minister of Foreign Affairs and Worship of Argentina, 1986 
Emmanuel Pelaez - Filipino diplomat, Rank of Datu, 1987 
Luis Moreno Salcedo - Filipino diplomat, Rank of Datu, 1987 
Salvador P. Lopez - Filipino diplomat, Rank of Datu, 1987 
José Laurel III - Filipino diplomat, Rank of Datu, 1987 
Giulio Andreotti - 17th Minister of Foreign Affairs of Italy, Rank of Datu, 1988 
Hiroshi Nakajima - Regional Director of the World Health Organization Western Pacific Region, Rank of Datu, 1988 
Carlos Lopez Contreras - Minister of Foreign Affairs of Honduras, Rank of Datu, 1988 
Abel Matutes - Member of the Commission of the European Communities of Spain, Rank of Datu, 1990 
Francisco Fernández Ordóñez - Foreign Minister of Spain, Rank of Datu, 1990 
 - Director General for North America and Asia of the Spanish Foreign Ministry, Rank of Lakan, 1990 
Enrique Silva Cimma - Foreign Minister of Chile, Rank of Datu, 1990 
Javier Solana - Foreign Minister of Spain, Rank of Datu, 1994 
Domingo Lucenario Jr. - Filipino diplomat, Rank of Datu, Gold Distinction, 2009. 
Jerril Santos - Filipino diplomat, Rank of Datu, Gold Distinction, 2009. 
Enrique Manalo - Filipino diplomat, Rank of Datu, Gold Distinction, 2010. 
Bernardita Catalla - former Philippine Ambassador to Lebanon, Rank of Datu, Gold Distinction, 2020. 
Douglas MacArthur - General of the Army, Field Marshal of the Philippines, and Supreme Commander for the Allied Powers, Rank of Lakan 
 Wassim Nanaa - Honorary Consul General of the Philippines in Aleppo Syria Rank of Grand Officer
 Jaime Cardinal Sin - Archbishop of Manila
Ali Alatas - 13th Foreign Minister of Indonesia, Rank of Raja, 1999
 Manny Pacquiao -Filipino boxer
 Chuan Leekpai - Former Prime Minister of Thailand
 Mohammad Mohsin - former Bangladeshi Foreign Secretary, Rank of Datu
 Johannes de Kok - European Commission head of delegation, Rank of Grand Cross Datu (Gold Distinction)
 Rafael E. Seguis - Foreign Affairs Undersecretary for Special Concerns, Rank of Datu
 Tadao Chino - President, Asian Development Bank, Grand Cross
 Patrick Pichi Sun - Ambassador for the Republic of China
 Ban Ki Moon - Secretary-General of the United Nations (Korea)
 Hillary Clinton - US Secretary of State
Jose T. Almonte - former National Security Advisor to President Fidel V. Ramos
Daniel Inouye - United States Senator, rank of Datu
 George Yeo - Former Minister of Foreign Affairs of Singapore, with rank of Datu
 Sadako Ogata - Former United Nations High Commissioner for Refugees.
 Khalifa bin Salman Al Khalifa - Prime Minister of Bahrain
 Gloria Steele - Mission Director, USAID/Philippines
 Takehiko Nakao - President, Asian Development Bank, Grand Cross.
Haruhiko Kuroda - President, Asian Development Bank.
Johannes Leimena, Deputy Prime Minister of Indonesia, Rank of Lakan
Alamsyah Ratu Perwiranegara, Minister of Religion, Rank of Lakan
Hassan Wirajuda, 15th Foreign Minister of Indonesia, Rank of Datu, 2008
Ibrahim Ismail, Sultan of Johor, Rank of Datu, 2019
Yasmin Umar, Deputy Defence Minister of Brunei, Rank of Datu, 2008
This article incorporates public domain text from the library of the Philippine Congress.

See also
 Sandugo
 Sandugo Festival

References

External links
 The Order of Sikatuna gov.ph
 Orders, Decorations and Medals of the Philippines
 Executive Order No. 236 of September 19, 2003, ESTABLISHING THE HONORS CODE OF THE PHILIPPINES TO CREATE AN ORDER OF PRECEDENCE OF HONORS CONFERRED AND FOR OTHER PURPOSES.
 Manuel L. Quezon III. Medals Girondists off-duty rants
 Philippines Orders-Decorations-Medals
 Ribbons of the Philippines 1
 Ribbons of the Philippines 2

Sikatuna, Order Of
Establishments by Philippine executive order